Silvana Giancola (born 24 February 1962) is an Argentine fencer. She competed in the women's individual and team foil events at the 1984 Summer Olympics. She is the sister of Sandra Giancola, who also fenced at the Olympics for Argentina.

References

External links
 

1962 births
Living people
Argentine female foil fencers
Olympic fencers of Argentina
Fencers at the 1984 Summer Olympics
Pan American Games medalists in fencing
Pan American Games bronze medalists for Argentina
Fencers at the 1983 Pan American Games
20th-century Argentine women